NGC 256 (also known as ESO 29-SC11) is open cluster in the Tucana constellation. It was discovered by John Frederick William Herschel on April 11, 1834.

References

External links
 

ESO objects
0256
Open clusters
Tucana (constellation)